Yahia Khiter (born January 28, 1994 in Mesra) is an Algerian footballer who plays for A Bou Saâda in the Algerian Ligue Professionnelle 2.

External links
 
 

1994 births
Algerian footballers
Algerian Ligue Professionnelle 1 players
MC Alger players
RC Arbaâ players
People from Mostaganem Province
Living people
Association football midfielders
21st-century Algerian people